Abhishek Verma may refer to:

 Abhishek Verma (archer) (born 1989), Indian archer
 Abhishek Verma (arms dealer) (born 1968), Indian arms dealer
 Abhishek Verma (sport shooter), Indian sport shooter